Actinopyga fusca is a species of sea cucumber within the family Holothuriidae, that can be found in shallow waters around New Caledonia. It has been classified as a 'Data deficient' species by the IUCN Red List as there isn't much information regarding the species, although it does occur in at least 1 marine protected area.

References 

Holothuriidae
Fauna of New Caledonia
Animals described in 1980
Fauna of the Pacific Ocean